In order to aid its efforts in wildland fire suppression and fire protection, the New Jersey Forest Fire Service operates a system of 21 fire towers at locations throughout the state of New Jersey in the United States. From these fire towers, using an instrument called the Osborne Fire Finder, or an alidade, and topographical maps, trained fire observers are able to spot and triangulate the location of possible wildfires. After ascertaining the location, the observer will file a "smoke report" which will be investigated and appropriate action taken by a local firewarden.

Founded in 1906, the New Jersey Forest Fire Service is the largest firefighting department within New Jersey and is an agency within the New Jersey Division of Parks and Forestry, a division of the New Jersey Department of Environmental Protection. With 85 full-time professional firefighters (career civil service positions), and approximately 2,000 trained part-time on-call wildland firefighters throughout the state, its mission is to protect "life and property, as well as the state's natural resources, from wildfire." The agency covers a primary response area of  comprising 77% of the state's land area and administered by three regional divisions. This primary response area includes the state's rural and suburban areas, as well as its public state parks and forests. In 2014, the New Jersey Forest Fire Service responded to 1,063 wildfire events that destroyed . The service conducted controlled burns or prescribed burns on  statewide.

The first fire lookout towers were often privately constructed during the late nineteenth century—many by large-tract landowners or corporations. However, after the creation of the Forest Fire Service, the state began erecting towers—some temporary, others permanent. The oldest erected by the Forest Fire Service that is in continuing operation is Culvers Station (then called the Normanook Fire Tower), first used in 1908, along the ridge of Kittatinny Mountain near Culver's Lake and the Culver's Gap.  Many of the state's fire towers were built during the Great Depression by the Civilian Conservation Corps (CCC). More were erected during World War II, to aid both the Forest Fire Service and to the Aircraft Warning Service, operating from mid-1941 to mid-1944, in which fire observers were assigned additional duty as enemy aircraft spotters. During World War II, the Lakewood Station was "used to listen to German U-boat communications in the Atlantic Ocean 12 miles to the east". Fire towers are located at key points of observation and on diverse terrain from northern New Jersey's mountain-and-valley terrain to the comparatively flat and low-elevation coastal plains in the south and central sections of the state. Today, these 21 towers provide New Jersey an inexpensive and effective first response system that aids the New Jersey Forest Fire Service in quickly suppressing and in preventing damage caused by reported wildfires. The Forest Fire Service estimates that 25 percent of wildfires within the state every year are first spotted by a lookout.

A number of these fire towers are listed on the National Historic Lookout Register.

List of fire towers

Fire towers in active service

Fire towers not in service

See also
 List of New Jersey state firewardens
 Wildfire suppression

References

Notes

Citations

External links
 New Jersey Forest Fire Service (official website)
 New Jersey Division of Parks and Forestry
 New Jersey Department of Environmental Protection

New Jersey Forest Fire Service
Fire lookout towers in New Jersey